The kronenthaler was the currency of the Austrian Netherlands from.1755. It was equivalent to 216 liards, 54 sols, 54 stuivers, or 2.7 gulden. During the Brabant Revolution in the Austrian Netherlands in 1789–90, it was briefly replaced with a short-lived revolutionary currency. Following the French occupation of the Austrian Netherlands in 1794, the Kronenthaler was replaced by the French franc.

Though legally valued at just 2.675 gulden in the Netherlands and 2.64 gulden several Southern German states, its acceptance at these places for 2.7 gulden created havoc in the valuations of the Dutch gulden and the South German gulden; see Kronenthaler.

See also

Kronenthaler
Coinage of the United States of Belgium (1790)

References 

Austria–Belgium relations
Early Modern currencies
Currencies of Belgium
1755 establishments in the Habsburg monarchy
Austrian Netherlands
1794 disestablishments in the Habsburg monarchy
1755 establishments in the Holy Roman Empire
1794 disestablishments in the Holy Roman Empire